The 1992–93 Northern Counties East Football League season was the 11th in the history of Northern Counties East Football League. The league consisted of 34 teams.

Premier Division

The division featured 20 teams, including the following new clubs:

Pickering Town, promoted from NCEL Division One
Stocksbridge Park Steels, promoted from NCEL Division One

In addition, Sutton Town changed their name to Ashfield United

Map

League table

Division One

The division featured 14 teams, including the following new clubs:

 Hucknall Town
 Lincoln United

Map

League table

References

1991-92
8